Western Township is one of twenty-four townships in Henry County, Illinois, USA.  As of the 2010 census, its population was 3,053 and it contained 1,240 housing units.  Western changed its name from Orion Township on April 13, 1857.

Geography

Cities, towns, villages
 Orion

Unincorporated towns
 Brook Lawn at 
 Sunny Hill at 
 Sunny Hill Estates at 
 Warner at 
(This list is based on USGS data and may include former settlements.)

Adjacent townships
 Colona Township (north)
 Edford Township (northeast)
 Osco Township (east)
 Andover Township (southeast)
 Lynn Township (south)
 Richland Grove Township, Mercer County (southwest)
 Rural Township, Rock Island County (west)
 Coal Valley Township, Rock Island County (northwest)

Cemeteries
The township contains these two cemeteries: Orion Lutheran and Western Township.

Major highways
  Interstate 74
  U.S. Route 150

Airports and landing strips
 Hughes RLA Airport

Demographics

School districts
 Orion Community Unit School District 223

Political districts
 Illinois's 14th congressional district
 State House District 71
 State Senate District 36

References
 United States Census Bureau 2008 TIGER/Line Shapefiles
 
 United States National Atlas

External links
 City-Data.com
 Illinois State Archives
 Township Officials of Illinois

Townships in Henry County, Illinois
Townships in Illinois
1856 establishments in Illinois
Populated places established in 1856